Benjamin Atiabou (born 19 January 2004) is an Austrian professional footballer who plays as a right-back for 2. Liga club Liefering, on loan from Red Bull Salzburg.

Club career
Atiabou has been playing as a right back in the Red Bull Salzburg system since 2009. He became a regular for Liefering during the 2021–22 season.

International career
Born in Salzburg, Atiabou is of Moroccan descent. He was called up to the Morocco U17s for a training camp in October 2020. He is a youth international for Austria, having played up to the Austria U18s.

Career statistics

Club

Notes

References

2004 births
Living people
Austrian footballers
Austria youth international footballers
Austrian people of Moroccan descent
Association football defenders
2. Liga (Austria) players
FC Red Bull Salzburg players
FC Liefering players